Martha, Inc.: The Story of Martha Stewart is a 2003 NBC television film starring Cybill Shepherd as Martha Stewart, in which the life of Martha Stewart is outlined starting from her life in New Jersey to the scandal behind her arrest. The film was shot in Nova Scotia.

Shepherd also played Martha Stewart in the 2005 CBS TV movie Martha: Behind Bars.

External links 
 

Films shot in Nova Scotia
American television films
2003 television films
2003 films
2000s English-language films
Films directed by Jason Ensler